Sergey Nikolayevich Ivanov (born 12 January 1979) is a Russian long-distance runner. He set both a national record and a personal best time of 27:53.12 by winning the 10,000 metres at the 2008 Russian Athletics Championships in Kazan, Russia.

Ivanov represented Russia at the 2008 Summer Olympics in Beijing, where he competed for the men's 10,000 metres. He finished the race in thirtieth place by five seconds ahead of Japan's Takayuki Matsumiya, with a time of 28:34.72.

References

External links

NBC 2008 Olympics profile

1979 births
Living people
People from Yadrinsky District
Sportspeople from Chuvashia
Russian male long-distance runners
Olympic male long-distance runners
Olympic athletes of Russia
Athletes (track and field) at the 2008 Summer Olympics
Russian Athletics Championships winners
20th-century Russian people
21st-century Russian people